Zombis is a monotypic genus of Galeodid camel spiders, first described by Eugène Simon in 1882. Its single species, Zombis pusiola is distributed in Israel.

References 

Solifugae
Arachnid genera
Monotypic arachnid genera